Fűzfői Atlétikai Klub is a professional football club based in Balatonfűzfő, Veszprém County, Hungary, that competes in the Bács-Kiskun county league.

Name changes
1928-?: Fűzfői Atlétikai Klub
?-1949: Fűzfői MTE
1949-1951: Fűzfői Lombik
1949: merger with Fűzfői Honpapír
1951-1956: Fűzfői Szikra SE
1956-1969: Fűzfői Atlétikai Klub
1969-1996: NIKE Fűzfői AK
1996-present: Fűzfői Atlétikai Klub

External links
 Profile on Magyar Futball

References

Football clubs in Hungary
Association football clubs established in 1928
1928 establishments in Hungary